This is a list of Western Illinois Leathernecks football players in the NFL Draft.

Key

Selections

See also
 Western Illinois Leathernecks football
 Western Illinois Leathernecks
 Western Illinois University

References

External links
 Western Illinois Leathernecks football

Western Illinois

Western Illinois Leathernecks NFL Draft